Ventsislav Bengyuzov (born 22 January 1991) is a Bulgarian professional footballer who plays as a midfielder for Pirin Blagoevgrad.

He previously played for Litex Lovech, Brestnik 1948, Pirin Blagoevgrad, Vidima-Rakovski, Bansko, Vereya, Arda Kardzhali and Slavia Sofia.

References

Bulgarian footballers
1991 births
Living people
PFC Litex Lovech players
OFC Pirin Blagoevgrad players
PFC Pirin Blagoevgrad players
PFC Vidima-Rakovski Sevlievo players
FC Bansko players
FC Vereya players
FC Arda Kardzhali players
PFC Slavia Sofia players
First Professional Football League (Bulgaria) players
Association football midfielders
Bulgaria youth international footballers
People from Kresna
Sportspeople from Blagoevgrad Province
21st-century Bulgarian people